Piotr Marian Massonius (1 February 1862 in Kursk, Russian Empire – 20 July 1945 in Vilnius (Wilno), prewar Second Polish Republic) was a Polish philosopher and teacher who was born into a family of expatriates during the Partitions of Poland.

Life
Massonius studied law at the Warsaw University and then abroad, where he took up philosophical and pedagogical studies at various German universities, mainly in Leipzig. He became one of the representatives of the Warsaw school of Positivism who formed a common front against Messianism together with the Polish Neo-Kantians.

Before Poland's return to independence, Massonius wrote for the Polish-language St. Petersburg weekly Kraj and contributed to the Polish-language periodicals Głos, Tygodnik Ilustrowany, Wisła, Gazeta Warszawska and Gazeta Polska. In 1897-1914 he served on the editorial board of Przegląd Filozoficzny (The Philosophical Review). In 1906 Massonius was elected to Russia's first National Duma. He became dean of the Humanities Department there. His writings included a collection of philosophical essays, and Polish translations of Western philosophers such as Immanuel Kant, Émile Tardieu and Schopenhauer.

On 21 September 1920, in Poznań, Massonius published an essay On Bolshevism, including observations on the 1847 Communist Manifesto of Marx and Engels. As one of the first Polish scholars following the 1917 Russian Revolution, he warned that communist ideology was merely a tool that enabled the Bolsheviks to assume the political role of a new ruling class in Russian society. Workers and peasants – Massonius wrote – were to become an embellishment for the commissars corresponding roughly to the former Tsarist governors, heads of administrative districts (volosts), prosecutors, heads of treasury offices, directors of school departments, and so on.

He wrote that the new ruling elite, comprising members of the  Cheka (Extraordinary Commission for Combating Counterrevolution and Sabotage) and Red Army officers, regarded as the "right-thinking", had only one thing in common as in every oligarchy. That is, they all represented communist clubs formed in every Soviet town. These clubs constituted the actual, though unofficial government, or rather the body overseeing the activities of the official government. From the very beginning the aim of the revolutionaries was not to bring about Marxist equality among the classes, but to create a new privileged class of their own. Civil equality was never their goal, it was only an object of subversive political manipulation justifying the means, he explained.

Works
 Marian Massonius, Szkice estetyczne (Sketches in Aesthetics), 1884
 Marian Massonius, Über den kritischen Realismus, 1887
 Marian Massonius, Racjonalizm w teorii poznania Kanta (Rationalism in Kant's Theory of Knowledge), 1898
 Marian Massonius, Rozdwojenie myśli polskiej (Duality of Polish Thought), 1901
 Marian Massonius, translations of, and prefaces to, works by E. Tardieu, A. Schopenhauer and E. Dubois-Reimond. 
 Dr. Marian Massonius, Dzieje Uniwersytetu Wilenskiego 1781-1832 (History of Wilno University). Notatki z wykładow w roku akademickim 1924–1925 (Notes of lectures in academic year 1924–25), Toruń, Wydawnictwo Uniwersytetu Mikołaja Kopernika, 2005.
 Prof. Marian Massonius, "O bolszewizmie" (On Bolshevism). Lecture presented at Poznań, August 21, 1920, in the "Głosy na czasie" (Voices of Our Time) series, no. 45, Poznań, Księgarnia św. Wojciecha, 1921, pp. 8–19, 40-42, 56-64.

See also
History of philosophy in Poland
List of Poles

Notes

References
 Tadeusz Czeżowski, Leon Gumański,  Knowledge, science, and values Published by Rodopi. Page 284.
 Stefan Konstańczak,  "Nurt neomesjanistyczny w filozofii polskiej końca XIX wieku" (Neo-Messianic trend in Polish philosophy at the end of the 19th century), SŁUPSKIE STUDIA FILOZOFICZNE nr 7 
  Uniwersytet Stefana Batorego w Wilnie - kadra akademicka. Senat USB Zbiory Specjalne. Dokumenty Życia Społecznego, dr Anna Supruniuk, Nicolaus Copernicus University in Toruń

1862 births
1945 deaths
Writers from Kursk
People from Kursky Uyezd
Members of the 1st State Duma of the Russian Empire
Polish scientists
19th-century Polish philosophers
20th-century Polish philosophers
Polish positivists
Academic staff of Vilnius University